Munjong is a temple name of several Korean monarchs, derived from the Chinese equivalent Wénzōng. It may refer to:
 Munjong of Goryeo (r.1046-1083), king of Korea
 Munjong of Joseon (r.1450-1452), king of Korea

See also 
 Wenzong (disambiguation) (Chinese romanization)

Temple name disambiguation pages

ja:文宗
ko:문종
zh:文宗